Your Choice Live Series 019 is a live album by Steel Pole Bath Tub. It was recorded live at Alte Turnhalle in Albig, Germany by Rock City Studios on September 17, 1992 and mixed in San Francisco by Steel Pole Bath Tub. This album is the first full-length live album by Steel Pole Bath Tub, produced by Tobby Holzinger.

More live material by Steel Pole Bath Tub has been released on a limited (and sold out) "live" 7 inch that was recorded in Alzey, Germany on January 23, 1991. It has been re-released as a part of the two CDs compilation Your Choice Records – the 7 inches.

Track listing
 Borstal
 Bozeman
 Sister
 Mercurochrome
 Slip
 Arizona Garbage Truck
 Carbon
 Scarlet
 Pseudoepherdrine Hydrochloride

Personnel
Steel Pole Bath Tub
Dale Flattum - Bass, vocals
Darren Mir-X -  Drums
Mike Malesteen - Guitar, vocals

Additional personnel
Tobby Holzinger - Producer

External links
Steel Pole Bath Tub official site
Your Choice Records official site

Steel Pole Bath Tub at TrouserPress.com
Interview w/Mike Morasky
0 to 1 records, 0 to 1 Records

Steel Pole Bath Tub albums
1993 live albums

fr:Steel Pole Bath Tub